Old Bittermann Building is a historic commercial building located in downtown Evansville, Indiana. It was built in 1885, and is a three-story, rectangular Italianate style brick building. It features a bracketed metal cornice. The building adjoins the Bitterman Building.

It was added to the National Register of Historic Places in 1980.

References

Commercial buildings on the National Register of Historic Places in Indiana
Italianate architecture in Indiana
Commercial buildings completed in 1885
Buildings and structures in Evansville, Indiana
National Register of Historic Places in Evansville, Indiana